is railway station on the Kyūdai Main Line operated by JR Kyushu in Kurume, Fukuoka Prefecture, Japan. The name means, literally, in front of Kurume University.

Lines 
Only local trains on the line stop at the station.

Layout 
The station consists of a side platforms serving a single track. The station building is a modern wooden structure with a triangular roof skylight. It houses a waiting area, automatic ticket vending machine and a staffed ticket window.

Management of the station has been outsourced to the JR Kyushu Tetsudou Eigyou Co., a wholly owned subsidiary of JR Kyushu specialising in station services. It staffs the ticket counter which is equipped with a POS machine but does not have a Midori no Madoguchi facility.

Adjacent stations

History
JR Kyushu opened the station on 11 March 2000 as an additional station on the existing track of the Kyudai Main Line.

Passenger statistics
In fiscal 2016, the station was used by an average of 1,289 passengers daily (boarding passengers only), and it ranked 135th among the busiest stations of JR Kyushu.

References

External links
Kurume-Daigakumae (JR Kyushu)

Railway stations in Fukuoka Prefecture
Railway stations in Japan opened in 2000